ں, (Arabic letter noon ghunna (U+06BA) ṇūṇ) is an additional letter of the Arabic script not used in the Arabic alphabet itself but used in Urdu, Saraiki and Shahmukhi Punjabi to represent a nasal vowel, .
ں or ن٘ is an additional letter of the Arabic script.  It is used in Urdu, Saraiki, Punjabi, Pashto, and many other Pakistani languages.

It is a nasal vowel used in many Indo-Aryan languages and Iranian languages. It is a dotless noon. In Saraiki and Balti, nūn ǧunna is sometimes written as ن٘.

Forms

Languages
The following languages use Nūn Ğunna:
Urdu
Punjabi
Pashto
Balochi
Khowar
Brahui
Torwali
Palula
Burushaski
Kalkoti
Shina
Indus Kohistani
Ormuri
Marwari
Hindko
Pahari-Pothwari
Dogri
Wanetsi
Gawar-Bati
Nepali
Kurdish
Shekhani
Kalami
Gujari
Dameli
Ushojo

See also
ݨ
ڑ
ن
ٹ
ھ
ڻ

External links
 Saraiki language, alphabet and pronunciation
 Urdu alphabet, pronunciation and language
 Pashto language and alphabet
 Punjabi language, alphabets and pronunciation
 Urdu: فلاں ، عریاں written/pronounced with ں instead of ن

References 

Arabic letters